A silverfish (most notably, the common species, Lepisma saccharinum) is a wingless insect in the order Zygentoma. The same name can be applied to many species in the order as a whole, which comprises the families the Lepismatidae, Nicoletiidae, Lepidotrichidae, Maindroniidae and Protrinemuridae.

Silverfish may also refer to:

Animals

Other individual insect species
Several other species also in the order Zygentoma, including:
Ctenolepisma lineata, or four-lined silverfish
Ctenolepisma longicaudata, or grey silverfish

Fish
Silver fish (fish); several species with the common name "silver fish"

Other Uses
Silverfish (video game), 2010 video game
Silver Fish Award, a Girl Guide award
Phil Silverfish, a character in the animated TV series Bump in the Night
Silverfish (band), a British indie band
Silverfish, a graphic novel by David Lapham
Silver Fish (or Silberfische), a nickname for Auto Union racing cars
"The Silver Fish", a nickname of snooker player Silvino Francisco
Silverfish, a song by Corey Taylor from CMFT

See also
 Goldfish (disambiguation)

Animal common name disambiguation pages